Gogane is a Village Development Committee in Bhojpur District in the Kosi Zone of eastern Nepal. At the time of the 1991 Nepal census it had a population of 2283 persons residing in 415 individual households. Gogane is the hometown of Neupane .

References

External links
UN map of the municipalities of Bhojpur District

Populated places in Bhojpur District, Nepal